Events from the year 1859 in art.

Events
 March 22 – Scottish National Gallery opens to the public in Edinburgh in neoclassical premises designed by W. H. Playfair.
 April 26 – William Morris marries his model, Jane Burden. Edward Burne-Jones presents them with a self-painted wardrobe.
 Frederic E. Church's The Heart of the Andes is exhibited in New York and draws 12,000 paying visitors.
 While attending the free school, the Académie Suisse, in Paris, Pissarro becomes friends with a number of younger artists also choosing to paint in a more realistic style, including Monet, Guillaumin and Cézanne.
 This year's Paris Salon admits photographs.
 The Artists Rifles set up in London as a volunteer unit of the British Army.

Works
 Peter Nicolai Arbo – Saint Olav at the Battle of Stiklestad
 Thomas Jones Barker – The Relief of Lucknow
 Albert Bierstadt – some dates approximate
 Bernese Alps
 Surveyor's Wagon in the Rockies
 The Wolf River, Kansas
 Philip Hermogenes Calderon – French Peasants Finding Their Stolen Child
 Frederic E. Church – The Heart of the Andes
 Peter Clodt von Jürgensburg – Monument to Nicholas I (Saint Petersburg), the world's largest equestrian statue supported only by the hind hooves of a rearing horse
 Thomas Couture – Daydreams
 Eugène Delacroix – Ovid among the Scythians (first version)
 Robert S. Duncanson – Landscape with Rainbow
 William Dyce – Beatrice (Lady with a Coronet of Jasmine)
 William Maw Egley – Omnibus Life in London
 Henri Fantin-Latour – Self-portrait
 Francesco Hayez – The Kiss, an expression of Italian Romanticism
 James Clarke Hook
 The Brook
 Luff, Boy!
 Arthur Hughes – The Long Engagement
 Charles-Auguste Lebourg – Gallic Victim (marble)
 Édouard Manet – The Absinthe Drinker (Ny Carlsberg Glyptotek, Copenhagen)
 John Everett Millais – The Vale of Rest
 Jean-François Millet – The Angelus (completed version) (Musée d'Orsay, Paris)
 Elisabet Ney – Arthur Schopenhauer (sculpture)
 Dante Gabriel Rossetti – Bocca Baciata, the first of his portraits of single female figures (Fanny Cornforth)
 John Roddam Spencer Stanhope – Thoughts of the Past
 James McNeill Whistler – Brown and Silver: Old Battersea Bridge

Births
 January 28 – Ambrosia Tønnesen, Norwegian sculptor (died 1948)
 May 25 – William Logsdail, English landscape, portrait, and genre painter (died 1944)
 June 16 – Paja Jovanović, one of the leading three Serbian Realist painters, with Đorđe Krstić and Uroš Predić (died 1957)
 June 17 – Walter Osborne, Irish Impressionist painter (died 1903)
 August 22 – John Henry Dearle, English textile designer (died 1932)
 October 17 – Childe Hassam, American Impressionist painter (died 1935)
 November 10 – Théophile Steinlen, Swiss/French painter (died 1923)
 November 27 – William Bliss Baker, American landscape painter (died 1886)
 December 2 – Georges-Pierre Seurat, French post-Impressionist painter (died 1891)
 December 25 – Anna Palm de Rosa, Swedish-born painter (died 1924)
 December 30 – Henrietta Rae, English painter (died 1928)

Deaths

 February 8 – William Edward West, American portrait painter (born 1788)
 March 3 – Cornelis Cels, Belgian painter of portraits and historical subjects (born 1778)
 March 24 – James Stark, English painter (born 1794)
 April 22 – Edward Villiers Rippingille, English painter (born c.1790)
 May 5 – Charles Robert Leslie, English genre works painter (born 1794)
 May 8 – José de Madrazo y Agudo, Spanish Neoclassicist painter (born 1781)
 June 7 – David Cox, English landscape painter (born 1783)
 June 20 – Hans Michelsen, Norwegian sculptor (born 1789)
 August 3 – Alexey Tyranov, Russian painter (born 1801)
 August 27 – Catharine Hermine Kølle, Norwegian adventurer and painter (born 1788)
 October 21 – William Jennys, American naïve art portrait painter (born 1774)
 November 13 - Ernesta Legnani Bisi, Italian painter and engraver (born 1788)
 November 17 – James Ward, English animal painter and engraver (born 1769)
 December 17 – Jan Feliks Piwarski, Polish painter and professor of art (born 1794)
 date unknown – John Bacon, English sculptor (born 1777)

References

 
Years of the 19th century in art
1850s in art